Saint Lambert's Church or Saint Lambert's Cathedral may refer to:
 Saint Lambert's Church, Münster, a Roman Catholic church in Münster, Germany, that features hanging cages that held the dismembered bodies of leaders of the Münster Rebellion
 St. Lambert's Church, Bergen, a Lutheran town church in Bergen, Germany
 Saint Lambert's Cathedral, Liège, a former Roman Catholic cathedral in Liège, Belgium